Salanoemia sala, the maculate lancer, is a butterfly belonging to the family Hesperiidae found in India, Thailand, Laos and Vietnam.

Description

Food plants
The larvae feed on Calamus rotang, Calamus thwaitesii, Calamus pseudofeanus and Calamus hookerianus.

References

Hesperiinae
Butterflies of Asia
Butterflies of Indochina